Caitlin Kinnunen (born November 8, 1991) is an American actress. She is best known for playing Emma Nolan in the musical The Prom, for which she was nominated for a Tony Award for Best Actress in a Leading Role in a Musical in 2019.

Early life and education 
Kinnunen grew up in Camano Island, Washington. Her parents are Betsy Stam, an administrator at Everett Community College and Randy Kinnunen, a former law enforcement agent. She was homeschooled. Her parents enrolled her and her sister in theatre classes as children so they would not be afraid of public speaking.

She moved to New York in 2008 to pursue her theatre career.

Acting career 
Kinnunen made her Broadway debut at age 16, as a replacement for the role of Thea in Spring Awakening. In 2010, Kinnunen was the understudy for the role of Natalie in the national tour of Next to Normal.

Following these theater performances, Kinnunen took on a number of television and film roles. She was the lead character in the film Sweet Little Lies in 2011 and a minor character in It's Kind of a Funny Story, We Need to Talk About Kevin, and The Intern.

She was next seen in the 2013 pre-Broadway performances of The Bridges of Madison County as Carolyn, and she continued the role when the production moved to Broadway the following year. The show closed on May 18, 2014, after 137 performances.

In 2014, Kinnunen auditioned for the role of Alyssa in a reading for The Prom. She ultimately was cast as the lead character, Emma Nolan, and went on to perform the role in Atlanta in 2016, before the show moved to Broadway in 2018. For this performance, she was nominated for a Tony Award for Best Performance by a Leading Actress in a Musical. Kinnunen and co-star Isabelle McCalla's kiss during their performance at the 2018 Macy’s Thanksgiving Day Parade made national news as the first LGBT kiss in the parade's history. The production closed on August 11, 2019, after 23 previews and 309 regular performances.

Personal life 
In 2019, in an interview for Nylon, Kinnunen announced, after years of identifying as a straight ally, that she was dating a woman. She has since come out as bisexual/queer.

She has type 1 diabetes.

Acting credits

Film

Television

Theatre

Awards and nominations

References 

1991 births
21st-century American actresses
21st-century American singers
21st-century American women singers
Actresses from Washington (state)
American musical theatre actresses
American people of Finnish descent
Living people
Singers from Washington (state)
LGBT actresses
People with type 1 diabetes
LGBT people from Washington (state)
People from Camano, Washington
21st-century LGBT people